Maharajganj Subdivision is a subdivision out of two subdivisions of Siwan district (One out of 101 Subdivisions of Bihar). It comprises 6 Blocks of Siwan. Maharajganj Subdivision comprises  of area and the population of the subdivision (according to 2011 census of India) is 10,41,905 individuals.

Blocks of Maharajganj Subdivision

References

Subdivisions of Bihar